Henry Ward (c. 1519 – 1556), of Gray's Inn, London and Kirby Bedon and Postwick, Norfolk, was an English barrister.

In April 1554 he was elected as one of the two Members of Parliament for Norwich.

References

1556 deaths
Politicians from London
People from South Norfolk (district)
English MPs 1554
Year of birth uncertain
People from Broadland (district)